The Ericson 25, also called the Ericson 25 Mark I is an American trailerable sailboat that was designed by Bruce King as a cruiser and first built in 1973.

The design was replaced in the company product line in 1978 by the Ericson 25+, also called the Ericson 25 Mark II.

Production
The design was built by Ericson Yachts in the United States, from 1973 until 1978, but it is now out of production.

Design
The Ericson 25 is a recreational keelboat, built predominantly of fiberglass, with wood trim. It has a masthead sloop rig, a raked stem, an angled transom, a transom-hung rudder controlled by a tiller and a fixed fin keel or an optional keel and centerboard combination.

A tall rig was also available, with a mast about  taller, intended for areas with lighter winds.

The boat is normally fitted with a small inboard engine or a  outboard motor for docking and maneuvering. The fuel tank holds .

The design has sleeping accommodation for four people, with a double "V"-berth in the bow cabin and two straight settee quarter berths in the main cabin, around a drop-leaf table. The galley is located on both sides of the companionway ladder. The galley is equipped with a two-burner stove, an icebox and a sink. The head is located just aft of the bow cabin on the starboard side. There is an anchor locker in the bow.

For downwind sailing the design may be equipped with a spinnaker.

Variants
Ericson 25 fin keel
This model displaces  and carries  of lead ballast.
Ericson 25 keel and centerboard
This model displaces  and carries  of ballast.

Operational history
In a 2010 review Steve Henkel wrote, "when she came out in 1972, this vessel was seen as remarkably roomy for a 25-footer, as indeed she was ... The Ericson 25 Mk I ... is well-finished and nicely laid out for comfortable alongshore cruising, She is also designed to race, with testing done in the Davidson Laboratory at Stevens Institute and a hull rated as a quarter-tonner. Best features: She cleverly combines a high aspect ratio centerboard with a trunk almost totally beneath the cabin sole, eliminating the nuisance of a protruding trunk splitting the cabin in two. Her sales brochure touts her easy trailerability, and shows a photo of the boat on a four-wheel trailer, her 7,700 pounds of load towed by a Cadillac sedan—something that today no ordinary car, including a Cadillac, could come close to doing. Worst features: We could not come up with any significant negative features."

See also
List of sailing boat types

References

External links
Photo of an Ericson 25

Keelboats
1970s sailboat type designs
Sailing yachts
Trailer sailers
Sailboat type designs by Bruce King
Sailboat types built by Ericson Yachts